Porsanger is a municipality in Finnmark county, Norway

Porsanger may also refer to:

People
 Anders Porsanger (1735–1780), first Sami who received a higher education
 Jelena Porsanger (born 1967), Russian Sami ethnographer and university rector

Places
 Porsanger Peninsula, peninsula in Finnmark county, Norway

Other
 Garrison of Porsanger, based at Porsangmoen in Porsanger, Norway; world's northernmost military garrison
 Porsangerfjorden, fjord in Finnmark county, Norway
 Porsanger IL, Norwegian multi-sports club from Lakselv, Finnmark